"Stop" is a song by Ryan Adams and The Cardinals from their album Cardinology. The track closes the album (excluding bonus tracks) and is concerned with the topic of substance abuse.

"Stop" is the only slow song on Cardinology and was featured on A&E's The Cleaner on September 30, 2008.

Personnel
 Ryan Adams —  Vocals and piano
 Neal Casal —  Background vocals
 Chris Feinstein — Bass
 Jon Graboff —  Pedal steel guitar
 Brad Pemberton — Drums
 Michael Panes — Violin

Notes

Ryan Adams songs